An Angel Has Arrived (Spanish: Ha llegado un ángel) is a 1961 Spanish musical film directed by Luis Lucia, starring child star Marisol with music by Augusto Algueró and lyrics by Antonio Guijarro.

Background
It is the second movie to star child singer and actress Marisol, being A Ray of Light the first one. It is the first of six movies in which Marisol shared the bill with Isabel Garcés. The film was a major commercial success.

Cast
Marisol
Isabel Garcés
Carlos Larrañaga
José Marco Davó
Ana María Custodio
Raquel Daina
Ángeles Macua
Pilar Sanclemente
Francisco Váquez
Jesús Puente

Jesús Álvarez
Jaime Blanch
Cesáreo Quezadas "Pulgarcito"

Songs
"El tren"
"Ola, ola, ola"
"Rumbita"
"Alegrías"
"Andalucía"
"La canción de Marisol"
"Bulerías"
"Jotas"
"Estando contigo"
"Estando contigo (final)"

References

External links

Culturalianet

Spanish musical drama films
1961 in Spain
Films directed by Luis Lucia
1960s musical drama films
1961 drama films
Films scored by Augusto Algueró
1960s Spanish films